Madeline Miller (born July 24, 1978) is an American novelist, author of The Song of Achilles (2011) and Circe (2018). Miller spent ten years writing The Song of Achilles while she worked as a teacher of Latin and Greek. The novel tells the story of the love between the mythological figures Achilles and Patroclus; it won the Orange Prize for Fiction, making Miller the fourth debut novelist to win the prize. She is a 2019 recipient of the Alex Awards.

Early life
Miller was born on July 24, 1978, in Boston and grew up in New York City and Philadelphia. After graduating from Brown University with a bachelor's and master's in Classics (2000 and 2001, respectively), Miller then went on to teach Latin, Greek, and Shakespeare to high school students. She also studied for a year at the University of Chicago's Committee on Social Thought working towards a PhD and from 2009 to 2010 at the Yale School of Drama for an MFA in Dramaturgy and Dramatic Criticism.  Miller lived in Cambridge, Massachusetts teaching and writing.

Miller told a reporter from The Guardian that her inspirations include David Mitchell, Lorrie Moore, Anne Carson, and Virgil.

Miller expressed "hate" and "visceral disgust" towards Ayn Rand's book The Fountainhead. As she herself indicated, she hates the "ideas behind it". Instead, she prefers books by James Herriot and Chinua Achebe.

Novels

The Song of Achilles

The Song of Achilles, Miller's debut novel, was released in September 2011. The book took her ten years to write. Set in Greece, the novel tells the story from Patroclus' point of view and the bond that grew between him and Achilles. The novel won the 17th annual Orange Prize for Fiction.

Circe

Circe, Miller's second novel, was released on April 10, 2018. The book is a modern reimagining told from the perspective of Circe, an enchantress in Greek mythology who is featured in Homer's Odyssey. Circe was ranked the second-greatest book of the 2010s by Paste. Tutor House ranked Circe in its top books for Classics students in 2021. An 8-part miniseries adaptation of the book has been greenlit for HBO Max. Rick Jaffa and Amanda Silver are set to write and produce the adaptation.

Galatea
A short story originally released as an e-book in 2013. It was later released in hardback in March 2022. The novel is a retelling of the Greek myth Pygmalion from the perspective of the sculptor's statue.

Heracles' Bow
A short story contained within The Song of Achilles, published on August 7th 2012. It takes from the perspective of Philoctetes, how he suffered his snake bite, and his abandonment by his companions. Much of the story takes place as a dialogue between Philoctetes and an imaginary Heracles, though other characters from The Song of Achilles also appear in it.

Persephone
In December 2021, Miller announced via an Instagram post that she was working on her new novel, about the goddess Persephone.

Awards

Bibliography
 The Song of Achilles. London: Bloomsbury, 2011. , 
 Circe: A Novel. New York, NY: Little, Brown and Company, 2018. ,

References

External links
 
 

1978 births
Living people
Brown University alumni
Writers from Boston
21st-century American women writers
American women novelists
Novelists from Massachusetts
University of Chicago alumni
Yale School of Drama alumni
21st-century American novelists
Shipley School alumni
Women science fiction and fantasy writers